USS Carlson (BDE-9/DE-9) was an  short-hull destroyer escort in the United States Navy. It was named after Chief Machinist's Mate Daniel William Carlson (1899–1942), who was killed during the Battle of Midway aboard the destroyer . The ship was launched and commissioned in 1943. Carlson was assigned to the Pacific fleet during World War II and spent time as a convoy escort and took part in the Battle of Iwo Jima. At the end of the war in 1945 Carlson was decommissioned and the ship was sold the following year.

Service history
Carlson'''s keel was laid on 28 November 1941, at the Charlestown Navy Yard in Boston, Massachusetts. Carlson was originally scheduled for transfer to Britain as BDE-9. BDE-9 was launched on 10 May 1943, sponsored by Mrs. Irene Carlson, the widow of the ship's namesake, and commissioned 10 May 1943.Carlson sailed from Norfolk, Virginia, 23 July 1943 for Espiritu Santo, where she arrived on 31 August. For seven months she was at sea almost constantly, aiding in the Guadalcanal and northern Solomon Islands operations with convoy escort and anti-submarine patrol services. Returning to San Francisco, California for overhaul in May 1944, Carlson trained with submarines and acted as target ship and plane guard for aircraft in the Hawaiian area from June through September 1944.

The escort vessel arrived at Eniwetok on 6 October 1944 to begin escort duty between that atoll and Ulithi, guarding convoys composed mainly of tankers. She thus contributed to the success of operations in the Philippines, and later at Iwo Jima, until 21 March 1945, when she sailed from Ulithi for Leyte. Here she was assigned to the screen of the Southern Attack Force for the assault on Okinawa.Carlsons task unit arrived off Okinawa to launch the initial assault waves on the morning of 1 April 1945. During that day, and the five that followed, she conducted anti-submarine patrols during the daylight hours and retired to seaward guarding the transports at night. From 6–17 April, she sailed to Saipan and back, escorting transports and cargo ships with reinforcements, then took up a screening station between Okinawa and Kerama Retto. On her first night, a Japanese plane launched a torpedo which passed harmlessly under Carlsons bow. Three more times during the next two weeks Japanese planes were driven off by the escort vessel's gunners. After another voyage to Saipan, Carlson screened on various stations off Okinawa, during a period of heavy kamikaze attacks.

A kamikaze fighter struck Carlson on one occasion but the plane hit the water and lost all momentum before striking the ship, and did not explode. The dead Japanese pilot was retrieved by Carlsons crew.

Clearing Okinawa on 29 June 1945, she sailed to Leyte to join the screen for the replenishment group serving TF 38. With this group she aided the Third Fleet in maintaining a constant offensive on Japan proper through the close of the war. On 16 September, she got underway for San Pedro, California, where she was decommissioned on 10 December 1945. Carlson was sold on 17 October 1946.Carlson'' received two battle stars for World War II service.

Awards

References 

Evarts-class destroyer escorts
World War II frigates and destroyer escorts of the United States
Ships built in Boston
1943 ships